Cociuba may refer to several places in Romania:

Cociuba, a village in Dieci Commune, Arad County
Cociuba Mare, a commune in Bihor County
Cociuba Mică, a village in Pietroasa Commune, Bihor County